John Brooke Howse (10 October 1913 – 11 July 2002) was an Australian politician. He was born in Orange, New South Wales, the son of Sir Neville Howse, a minister in the Nationalist government of Stanley Bruce. He attended Geelong Grammar School and the University of Sydney before becoming a company director. He underwent military service 1939–46; on his return, he was elected to the Australian House of Representatives for the Liberal Party, defeating Labor's John Breen for his father's old seat of Calare. He held the seat until he resigned on 28 September 1960, becoming a manager and company director. He died in 2002.

References

Liberal Party of Australia members of the Parliament of Australia
Members of the Australian House of Representatives for Calare
Members of the Australian House of Representatives
Royal Australian Navy personnel of World War II
1913 births
2002 deaths
20th-century Australian politicians
People educated at Geelong Grammar School
Royal Australian Navy officers